Wezep is a railway station located in Wezep, Netherlands. The station was opened in 1863 and is located on the Amersfoort–Zwolle section of the Utrecht–Kampen railway (Centraalspoorweg). The train services are operated by Nederlandse Spoorwegen.

Train services

Bus services

External links
NS website 
Dutch Public Transport journey planner 

Railway stations in Gelderland
Railway stations opened in 1863
Railway stations on the Centraalspoorweg
Oldebroek